The 763rd Tank Battalion was an independent tank battalion of the United States Army during World War II.

References

763
Battalions of the United States Army in World War II